Ethan Bryant (born August 20, 2001) is an American soccer player who plays as a midfielder for Sporting Kansas City II in MLS Next Pro.

Career

San Antonio FC
Bryant signed his first professional contract with San Antonio FC on February 14, 2018.  He made his professional debut on May 23, 2018, starting in a U.S. Open Cup match against the Colorado Springs Switchbacks. Bryant became San Antonio FC's youngest all-time goalscorer on September 29, 2018, when he scored his first professional goal against Seattle Sounders FC 2. On January 16, 2019, it was announced that Bryant would again play for the SAFC senior squad during their 2019 USL Championship season.

Richmond Kickers
During the 2021 season, San Antonio FC loaned Bryant to USL League One side Richmond Kickers where he saw 13 appearances. Following the 2021 season, Richmond signed Bryant on a permanent basis.

The 2022 season saw Bryant as a regular midfield starter, with 28 appearances. The Kickers finished top of the regular season table, and Bryant was named USL League One Young Player of the Year.

Sporting Kansas City II
On December 13, 2022, Richmond announced a transfer of Bryant to MLS Next Pro side Sporting Kansas City II for an undisclosed fee.

Statistics

Honors

Individual
USL League One Young Player of the Year: 2022

References

External links

2001 births
Living people
Soccer players from San Antonio
American soccer players
American expatriate soccer players
Association football midfielders
USL Championship players
San Antonio FC players
K.S.V. Roeselare players
American expatriate sportspeople in Belgium
Expatriate footballers in Belgium
Richmond Kickers players
USL League One players
Sporting Kansas City II players